Workerism is a political theory that emphasizes the importance of or glorifies the working class.

As revolutionary praxis 

Workerism (or ) is a political analysis, whose main elements were to merge into autonomism, that starts out from the power of the working class.

 builds on Marx's claim that capital reacts to the struggles of the working class; the working class is active and capital reactive. 
Technological development: Where there are strikes, machines will follow. "It would be possible to write a whole history of the inventions made since 1830 for the sole purpose of providing capital with weapons against working-class revolt." (Capital, Vol. 1, Chapter 15, Section 5)
Political development: The factory legislation in England was a response to the working class struggle over the length of the working day. "Their formulation, official recognition and proclamation by the State were the result of a long class struggle." (Capital, Vol. 1, Chapter 10, Section 6)
 takes this as its fundamental axiom: the struggles of the working class precede and prefigure the successive re-structurations of capital.

The workerists followed Marx in seeking to base their politics on an investigation of working class life and struggle. Through translations made available by Danilo Montaldi and others, they drew upon previous activist research in the United States by the Johnson-Forest Tendency and in France by the group . The Johnson-Forest Tendency had studied working class life and struggles within the Detroit auto industry, publishing pamphlets such as "The American Worker" (1947), "Punching Out" (1952) and "Union Committeemen and Wildcat Strikes" (1955). They too began investigating and writing about what was going on inside workplaces, in their case inside both auto factories and insurance offices.

The journal  ("Red Notebooks", 1961–5), along with its successor  ("Working Class", 1963–6), both founded by Negri and Tronti, developed workerist theory, focusing on the struggles of proletarians.

Associated with this theoretical development was a praxis based on workplace organising, most notably by Lotta Continua. This reached its peak in the Italian "Hot Autumn" of 1969.

By the mid-1970s, however, the emphasis shifted from the factory to "the social factory"—the everyday lives of working people in their communities. The operaist movement was increasingly known as autonomist.

See also 
 Autonomism
 Labourism
 Mario Tronti
 Raniero Panzieri

References

Further reading 

 
  (Extract: The Workerists and the unions in Italy's 'Hot Autumn' at Libcom.org)

External links

Workerism as revolutionary movement 
 Sergio Bologna, Workerism Beyond Fordism: On the Lineage of Italian Workerism at Viewpoint Magazine
 A critique of autonomism, which grew from operaismo, published by a Trotskyist group
 Interviews of members of the operaismo movement

Workerism as pejorative 
  A critique of "workerism" with a Marxian definition of proletariat.
 A critique of workerism from an ANC (South Africa) internal bulletin in 1986. It differentiates three types of workerism.

Autonomism
Marxist theory
Syndicalism
Labor
Economic ideologies